György Holovits (15 June 1946 – 3 May 2018) was a Hungarian sailor. He competed at the 1972 Summer Olympics and the 1980 Summer Olympics.

References

External links
 

1946 births
2018 deaths
Hungarian male sailors (sport)
Olympic sailors of Hungary
Sailors at the 1972 Summer Olympics – Star
Sailors at the 1980 Summer Olympics – Star
Sportspeople from Somogy County